Sam Rockwell is an American actor. He became well known for his leading roles in Teenage Mutant Ninja Turtles  (1990), Lawn Dogs (1997), Confessions of a Dangerous Mind (2002), Matchstick Men (2003), The Hitchhiker's Guide to the Galaxy (2005), Moon (2009), Gentlemen Broncos (2009), G-Force (2009), Seven Psychopaths (2012), Mr. Right (2015), and Richard Jewell (2019). He has also played supporting roles in The Green Mile (1999), Galaxy Quest (1999), Charlie's Angels (2000), Frost/Nixon (2008), Iron Man 2 (2010), Conviction (2010), Cowboys & Aliens (2011), The Way, Way Back (2013), Three Billboards Outside Ebbing, Missouri (2017), Vice (2018), and Jojo Rabbit (2019).

For his performance in Three Billboards Outside Ebbing, Missouri (2017), Rockwell won the Academy Award for Best Supporting Actor and the BAFTA Award for Best Actor in a Supporting Role.

Film

Television

Theatre

Video games

See also
 List of awards and nominations received by Sam Rockwell

References

Male actor filmographies
American filmographies